The 2021–22 FC Schalke 04 season was the 118th season in the football club's history and their sixth season in the 2. Bundesliga, where they were relegated from the Bundesliga the previous season after spending 30 consecutive seasons in the league. In addition to the domestic league, Schalke 04 participated in this season's edition of the domestic cup, the DFB-Pokal. This was the 21st season for Schalke in the Veltins-Arena, located in Gelsenkirchen, North Rhine-Westphalia. The season covered a period from 1 July 2021 to 30 June 2022.

Players
Note: Players' appearances and goals only in their Schalke career.

Transfers

In

Out

Friendly matches

Competitions

Overview

2. Bundesliga

League table

Results summary

Results by round

Matches
The league fixtures were announced on 25 June 2021.

DFB-Pokal

Statistics

Squad statistics

Goalscorers

Clean sheets

References

FC Schalke 04 seasons
Schalke